Exploring The Axis is the first full-length album by Thin White Rope.

Track listing

The original vinyl version of the album contained tracks 1-10 (in the US), or tracks 1-7, 9, 10 & 13 (in the UK). Track 11 was a bonus track on the cassette version of Exploring The Axis and tracks 11 and 12 have also been released on the "Bottom Feeders" mini-album.

Personnel
 Guy Kyser – guitar, vocals
 Roger Kunkel – guitar, vocals
 Stephen Tesluk  – bass, guitar, vocals
 Jozef Becker – drums
 Jeff Eyrich – producer
 Dennis Dragon – engineer
 Ross Garfield – drum technician

References

1985 debut albums
Frontier Records albums
Thin White Rope albums
Albums produced by Jeff Eyrich